10 Years of Abuse (and Still Broke) is the title of sludge metal band Eyehategod's only live album, released on May 29, 2001. Although not all the tracks are live, it is still considered a live album, as the majority of tracks are live, and there are no studio tracks (the rest consist of demos and radio performances).

Track listing
 "Left To Starve" – 5:08
 "Hit a Girl" – 5:16
 "Depress" – 9:29
 "Children of God" – 4:44
 "White Nigger" – 4:08
 "Depress" – 3:28
 "Take as Needed for Pain" – 5:08
 "My Name is God (I Hate You)" – 5:07
 "Lack of Almost Everything" – 4:36
 "Blood Money" – 3:47
 "Children of God" – 4:52
 "Sister Fucker, Pt. 1/Sister Fucker, Pt. 2" – 5:51
 "30$ Bag" – 3:11
 "Zero Nowhere" – 5:15
 "Methamphetamine" – 5:37

Tracks 1–4 are taken from the original 1990 demo Lack of Almost Everything. Tracks 5–8 were recorded live on KXLU, August 2, 1994. Tracks 9–16 were recorded live in Europe, April 2000. All songs written by Eyehategod.

Credits

Tracks 1–4
Jim Bower – Guitar
Mike IX Williams – Vocals
Joe LaCaze – Drums
Marc Schultz – Bass
Steve Dale – Guitar

Tracks 5–8
Jim Bower – Guitar
Michael Williams – Vocals
Joe LaCaze – Drums
Marc Schultz – Bass
Brian Patton – Guitar
Chris Elder – Recording
Phil Vera – Recording

Tracks 9–15
Jim Bower – Guitar
Michael Williams – Vocals
Joe LaCaze – Drums
Danny Nick – Bass
Brian Patton – Guitar
Dave Fortman – Producer

Others
Angela Boatwright – Live Photo
Tom Bejgrowicz – Design, Layout and Additional Photography

References

Eyehategod live albums
Albums produced by Dave Fortman
2001 live albums
Century Media Records live albums